The Kodal mine is one of the largest titanium mines in Norway. The mine is located in Vestfold. The mine has reserves amounting to 70 million tonnes of ore grading 8% titanium.

References 

Titanium mines in Norway
Vestfold